Bozrah is a town in New London County, Connecticut, United States. The population was 2,429 at the 2020 census. Bozrah contains three villages: Fitchville, the town center; Leffingwell, a crossroads on Route 82; and Gilman, a mill village along Fitchville Road.

History
The area that became Bozrah was first settled as part of the original "nine-miles-square" of Norwich as well as part of the Parish of West Farms. The area became its own parish, called "New Concord" or the "Fourth Society of Norwich", in 1737.

A legend about the origin of the town's name
Bozrah is the name of a pastoral community mentioned several times in the Old Testament, sometimes with pleasing connotations, sometimes not. The town name may have resulted from the happy connotations connected with Micah chapter 2, verse 12: "I will surely gather the remnant of Israel; I will put them together as the sheep of Bozrah, as the flock in the midst of their fold; they shall make a great noise by reason of the multitude of men." In Hebrew, the name Bozrah signifies "an enclosure".

According to a persistent legend, the name "Bozrah" was derived from another Biblical text, which came to someone's mind under the particular circumstances surrounding the community's petition to the Connecticut General Assembly for township status. Whether or not the story is true, the informal, early name "New Concord" was dropped when the town was incorporated.

The community, according to the legend, really wanted to call itself "Bath" after the famous spa in England. The local man chosen to carry the parish's request to Hartford had a somewhat eccentric manner of dress, however, and when he appeared before the Legislature he was dressed in loud, parti-colored homespun so odd as to bring to the mind of one amused legislator the query of Isaiah 63:1: "Who is this that cometh from Edom, with dyed garments from Bozrah?" Overcome by the humorous appropriateness of this verse, the Assembly decided to name the town "Bozrah" when it incorporated the place.

Points of interest
Bozrah Congregational Church and Parsonage, at 17 and 23 Bozrah St., was added to the National Register of Historic Places on August 26, 1991.
Hopemead State Park, an undeveloped 60-acre recreation area.

Geography
The town is bordered by the city of Norwich to the east and by the town of Montville to the south, Salem to the southwest, Colchester to the west, Lebanon to the northwest, and Franklin to the north. Gardner Lake, a popular recreational destination, occupies the southwestern corner of the town and extends into Salem and Montville.

Demographics

As of the census of 2000, there were 2,357 people, 883 households, and 662 families residing in the town. The racial makeup of the town was 96.39% White, 0.55% African American, 0.85% Native American, 0.51% Asian, 0.04% Pacific Islander, 0.51% from other races, and 1.15% from two or more races. Hispanic or Latino of any race were 1.78% of the population.

There were 883 households, out of which 32.6% had children under the age of 18 living with them, 62.6% were married couples living together, 7.4% had a female householder with no husband present, and 25.0% were non-families. 19.6% of all households were made up of individuals, and 6.3% had someone living alone who was 65 years of age or older.  The average household size was 2.64 and the average family size was 3.03.

In the town, the population was spread out, with 23.5% under the age of 18, 5.9% from 18 to 24, 30.1% from 25 to 44, 26.5% from 45 to 64, and 14.0% who were 65 years of age or older.  The median age was 40 years. For every 100 females, there were 100.8 males.  For every 100 females age 18 and over, there were 101.6 males.

The median income for a household in the town was $57,059, and the median income for a family was $65,481. Males had a median income of $45,291 versus $27,361 for females. The per capita income for the town was $26,569.  About 2.2% of families and 3.7% of the population were below the poverty line, including 5.5% of those under age 18 and 4.7% of those age 65 or over.

As of 2015, the median household income in Bozrah was estimated to be $77,045, compared to $70,331 for the State of Connecticut as a whole. The low income rate, defined as all persons whose annual household income is less than 200 percent of the poverty threshold, was 22%, compared to 30% statewide.

Education
The town's educational center, Fields Memorial School, serves grades Preschool to 8, and is located in Fitchville. While there is no high school in Bozrah, the town pays tuition for students attending Norwich Free Academy or Lyman Memorial; the state pays for students' tuition at Norwich Technical High School and Waterford High School.

Notable people

 Sam Gejdenson (born 1948), former United States congressman
 Alanson Hodges Hough (1803–1886), physician and politician
 Elijah Baldwin Huntington (1816–1877), author and Congregationalist minister
 Ishmail Spicer (1760–1832), composer, publisher and teacher
 Reuben Hyde Walworth (1788–1867), United States congressman, was nominated three times to become Justice of the United States Supreme Court

References

External links

Town of Bozrah official web page

 
Towns in New London County, Connecticut
Towns in Connecticut